Dalibor Vašenda (born 2 June 1991) is a professional Czech football player who currently plays for MFK Frýdek-Místek.

References

External links

1991 births
Living people
Czech footballers
Czech First League players
FC Baník Ostrava players
Association football midfielders